The Captain is a 2019 Chinese disaster-adventure film co-produced, co-cinematographed and directed by Andrew Lau, which stars Zhang Hanyu, Oho Ou, Du Jiang, Yuan Quan, Zhang Tian'ai, Li Qin, Zhang Yamei, and Yang Qiru. The film is based on the Sichuan Airlines Flight 8633 incident. The film was released in China on September 30, 2019 and received generally positive reviews.

Cast
 Zhang Hanyu as Liu Changjian
 Oho Ou as Xu Yichen
 Du Jiang as Liang Dong
 Yuan Quan as Bi Nan
 Zhang Tian'ai as Huang Jia
 Li Qin as Zhou Yawen
 Zhang Yamei as Zhang Qiuyue
 Yang Qiru as Yang Hui
 Gao Ge as Wu Yan

Cameos
 Huang Zhizhong
 Xiao Ai 
 Li Xian 
 Zhu Yawen
 Chen Shu
 Kan Qingzi 
 Jiao Junyan 
 Angelababy
 Guan Xiaotong
 Meng Ziyi
 Wu Yue
 Zhang Xiaoqian
 Feng Wenjuan
 Yu Kailei
 Li Mincheng
 Yu Jieping
 Yu Shibin
 Li Xinlin
 Zhang Lei

Production

Background
On 14 May 2018, Flight 8633 took off from Chongqing Jiangbei International Airport at 6:25 CST (22:25 UTC). Approximately 40 minutes after departure while over Xiaojin County, Sichuan at the altitude of 9 km, the right front segment of the windshield separated from the aircraft followed by an uncontrolled decompression. As a result of the sudden decompression, the flight control unit was damaged, and the loud external noise made spoken communications impossible. The co-pilot however, was able to use the transponder to squawk 7700, alerting Chengdu Shuangliu International Airport control about their situation. Because the flight was within a mountainous region, the pilots were unable to descend to the required 8,000 ft (2,400 m) to compensate for the loss of cabin pressure.

About 35 minutes later, the jetliner made an emergency landing at 7:42 CST (23:42 UTC) at Chengdu Shuangliu International Airport. The aircraft was overweight on landing. As a result, the plane took a longer distance to come to a stop and the tires burst.

Despite wearing a seatbelt, first officer Xu was partially sucked out of the aircraft. He suffered facial abrasions, a minor right eye injury and a sprained wrist. One of the flight attendants on the aircraft, Zhou Yanwen (Chinese: 周彦雯), also suffered a wrist injury after a large gust of wind from the cockpit caused her to fly to the roof of the cabin and land on the floor. She received treatment. Owing to the insulation design of the Airbus A319, the temperature did not drop immediately for the passengers, despite the cockpit's exposure to the outside environment, saving them from frostbite. The flight crew remained conscious and did not experience asphyxia or frostbite. No other crew member or passenger was injured.

Pre-production
On August 8, 2018, the National Film Board publicly released the late July Chinese film script (synopsis) for the record and project approval. Bona Film Group, main production company and distributor for the film, applied for filing of the film "The Captain," with scriptwriter Yu Yonggan. Its review status was "agreed to shoot in principle." On November 16, Sichuan Airlines 3U8883 returned to flight. Director Andrew Lau, producer Peggy Lee and two stars, Zhang Hanyu and Yuan Quan, also took this flight and witnessed this special moment together with Liu Chuanjian and all members of the "CAAC hero crew." Lau said in an exclusive interview that the selection criteria for extras were quite strict. Individuals with diseases such as hypertension and heart disease were not allowed to participate in the film.

The film was shot with the support and assistance of the CAAC. Under the coordination and organization of the China Civil Aviation Promotion and Education Center, hundreds of professionals from various departments of the civil aviation system participated in the production and shooting of the film. Zhang Hanyu, Yuan Quan and other casts went to the location of the incident to collect information, met with those who were involved in the event, and listened to the hero crew to envision the situation. To make the real "flying experience" available for the big screen audience, Bona Film Group invested nearly 30 million yuan in building a 1:1 airbus A319 simulator, used a motion platform to simulate the bumpiness and dizziness caused by the plane falling sharply at the height of 9800 meters, and brought in the Hollywood team who produced special effects for big Hollywood films such as Star Wars, Captain America, and Thor 3.

The cast all received specialized training before shooting. Zhang Hanyu, Oho Ou and Du Jiang, who played the role as pilots, completed specialized training for professional pilots. Yuan Quan, Zhang Tianai, Li Qin, Zhang Yamei and Yang Qiru also received all-round training from theory to practice. To play the role, Oho Ou had to wear three hours of makeup with special effects to depict his character's injury after the accident. His right eye was almost entirely covered by special effects makeup. By the end of the shooting, his facial allergy was severe, with many small red rashes on his face, but he still insisted on shooting. The "flying trio" of Zhang Hanyu, Ou Hao and Du Jiang learned theory in the classroom in the morning and practiced the plane driving skills in the simulation cabin in the afternoon in order to understand their characters' experience.

Filming 
The Captain was supported and assisted by the Civil Aviation Administration of China, included hundreds of professionals from the civil aviation system participated in the film development and filming process.

Shooting began on January 3, 2019 and ended on March 4, 2019. Filming began at Wuxi and on February 17, the film was transferred to be shot in Chengdu. Filming concluded in Lhasa, Tibet.

Release
The first poster was released on May 5, 2019 and the first official trailer was released on August 5, 2019. The film premiered in Beijing on September 25, 2019 with wide-release in China on September 30, 2019.

The Captain was the opening night film at the 15th Chinese American Film and TV Festival in Los Angeles where it won Best Feature Film. Yu Dong also won Best Producer.

Reception

Box-office
On October 3, 2019, the box office of "The Captain" collected another 263 million yuan in one day, and the cumulative box office exceeded 1 billion yuan.

The Captain grossed 55.15 million yuan (around 7.80 million U.S. dollars) on the second to last day of its presale.

Critical response 

Soundtrack
"The Wild Goose That Flies Far" Singer: Alan

"I Love the Blue Sky of the Motherland" Singer: Mao Amin

"Soaring In the Sky" Singer: Hu Xia

"Fearless" Singer: Gao Ge

References

External links
 
 
 

2019 films
2010s Mandarin-language films
Chinese drama films
Films shot in Sichuan
Films shot in Chongqing
Films shot in Tibet
Films set in Sichuan
Films directed by Andrew Lau
Films about aviation accidents or incidents